Gilah Yelin Hirsch (born 1944) is a multidisciplinary artist who works as a painter, writer, curator, and filmmaker. Her work explores the connections between science, art, and spirituality. She has been a leader in the International Society for the Study of Subtle Energies and Energy Medicine (ISSSEEM). Hirsch was a founding member of one of the earliest women art organizations, the Los Angeles Council of Women in the Arts (LACWA) and was active in the feminist art movement in Southern California. She was a professor of art at California State University, Dominguez Hills in Los Angeles since 1973 and became Professor Emerita in 2020. Presently, Hirsch continues painting, writing, theorizing, filmmaking, and is often invited to present her work in conferences and webinars world-wide.

Early life 
Hirsch grew up in a Montreal Jewish community in the mid 1940s, reading and learning from the Torah in Hebrew and Yiddish at an early age. "Gilah Yelin Hirsch has been immersed in Jewish studies since childhood." Her secular schooling was in English and French. While striving to learn about the world, Hirsch faced much emotional strife during her formative years. This was because of both her mother's mental illness and father's invalid state. To help her endure these physical and emotional assaults, Hirsch read "... the great philosophers, writers, early feminists, Freud and Jung, all included in the floor to ceiling library of my parents' small apartment."

Hirsch later on published Demonic to Divine: The Double Life of Shulamis Yelin, a book that includes excerpts of Hirsch's mother's diaries and some of her stories. "This book poignantly illuminates the dramatic duality of a public and private literary and emotional life through her published and unpublished stories of an idyllic Montreal childhood contrasted with deeply troubled and often shocking diary entries that document the author's lifelong battle with mental illness."

Education
Hirsch earned a B.A. from the University of California, Berkeley in 1967, and an MFA in pictorial arts from UCLA in 1970. After graduating she taught at Santa Monica College and the University of Judaism, (now American Jewish University). Then in 1973, Hirsch joined the art department at California State University Dominguez Hills in Los Angeles, and obtained tenure in 1978. She is now Professor Emerita.

Career 

Hirsch was a founding member of the Los Angeles Council of Women Artists (LACWA) (1971), the "mother" organization of many subsequent feminist art organizations. She also named and facilitated the Joan of Art Seminars, (originated by June Wayne), teaching artists the business aspects of their professional careers. Since then (1972), this has become common practice and a regular component of art school curricula. Hirsch said, "Who knew that what we were doing would become historic and significant in the history of art? Prior to that, women did not exist in art."

In 1974 Hirsch brought the life and work of Canadian artist Emily Carr to the attention of the American academic community at the College Art Association, Washington, DC.

Hirsch curated the exhibition, Metamagic, in 1978 at the California State University Dominguez Hills University Art Gallery in Los Angeles. This exhibit was the first held nationally in a major exhibition space to be focused on the spiritual in art and attracted worldwide attention. In 2009 she coordinated Stepping into the Light, an exhibition of portraits by California State University Dominguez Hills art students of women who had been sexually assaulted; these works were exhibited in the Young Women's Christian Association (YWCA) in Carson. The exhibition was went on to show in New York, London, New Zealand, China, Mexico, and the Congo and other parts of Africa.

Hirsch spent the fall semester of 1979 as visiting artist at Saint Martin's School of Art, London, England. She introduced  her painting and its related philosophical explorations at the Menninger Foundation’s annual conference on consciousness in Council Grove, Kansas (1982). Hirsch has been a presenter for numerous Council Grove conferences (sponsored by the Menninger Foundation, Life Science Institute, Center for Ecology and Energy Medicine) and has convened two conferences (1995, 2006). In 1983 Hirsch first presented her theory on the origin of alphabet, Cosmography: The Writing of the Universe, at the Council Grove Conference.

In 1985 Hirsch received a senior artist grant from the National Endowment for the Arts, which – with a sabbatical from California State University  – facilitated her year-long travel in Asia. In December 1986 she met Ngawangdanhup  Narkyid (Kuno), the official biographer of the Dalai Lama in Dharamsala, India, initiating a friendship that would prove to be life-changing for the artist.

Among Hirsch's numerous exhibitions since 1968, she's shown at the Los Angeles County Museum of Art (LACMA) in California, the Whitney Museum of American Art in New York, Hebrew Union College in California, 2011 Vincent Gallery, Moscow, Russia,  2009 Symbol Galeria, Budapest (Hungary), 2007 Piano Nobile Gallery, Kraków (Poland), 2006 Soviart Gallery, Kiev (Ukraine), 2006 Artoteka Gallery, Bratislava and 2005 Limes Galeria, Komarno (Slovakia), and the Jerusalem Biennale. More information in regards to Hirsch's exhibitions can be found on her resume, available on her website. Her archives are housed in the Smithsonian Archives of American Art.

Hirsch has also pursued an interest in architecture, and over a period of 35 years restored a 1900s duplex in Venice, California. Her house is featured in the 2010 book Cottages in the Sun: Bungalows of Venice, California.

Films 

Hirsch authored and produced two documentary films, Cosmography: The Writing of the Universe (1995) and Reading the Landscape (2019), which was a Silver Winner at the International Independent Film Awards (Winter 2019).

Cosmography: The Writing of the Universe traces the evolution of a series of interrelated ideas which Gilah Yelin Hirsch had studied over a period of twenty-five years. Lengthy sojourns in wilderness, augmented by world travels, have expanded her vision and the pool of information contributing to a theory on the origin of the alphabet as based in pattern in nature. Hirsch's multidisciplinary approach spans the realms of art, philosophy, psychology, theology, psychoneuroimmunology, spirituality and global culture. In a unique audio narrative which offers many glimpses into her life and work using science, mysticism, nature, healing, visionary art and insatiable curiosity have led her to exceptional experiences and insights. "Hirsch weaves a fascinating narrative of her life’s journey, illustrated by an astonishing 140 paintings, photographs and images."

Combining science and art, Reading the Landscape follows the global migratory pattern of humankind. It focuses on five forms identified in nature that are present in alphabets universally, ancient to modern, and show that these five forms were chosen ubiquitously as they mirror neurons and neural processes of perception and cognition. A central message is that despite our cultural diversity, humans are more alike than different.

Significant events 
 Los Angeles Council of Women Artists (LACWA), 1971.
 California State University Professor of Art & Design, 1973-2020.
 Inception of Cosmography (Resident Fellow of Dorland Mountain Colony,Temecula, CA), 1981.
 Theory of Cosmography Presentation (The Art of Gilah Yelin Hirsch, Menninger Foundation, Council Grove Conference, KS), 1982.
 The Alyce and Elmer Green Award, International Society for the Study of Subtle Energies & Energy Medicine, “for her innovative blending of science and art”, 2010.
 Smithsonian Archives of American Art, Washington DC, 2017- present

References

External links 

1944 births
Living people
20th-century Canadian women artists
Artists from Montreal
American video artists
Canadian video artists
Women video artists
University of California, Berkeley alumni
University of California, Los Angeles alumni
California State University, Dominguez Hills faculty